Laurenţiu Toma (born 29 April 1984 in Ploiești) is a Romanian handballer playing for HC Dobrogea Sud Constanța and the Romanian national team.

He ranked third in the 2009–10 EHF Champions League's top goalscorers list.

For his services to the team and the city, and his exemplary sportsmanship conduct, Toma was made honorary citizen of Constanța in 2010.

Achievements
Liga Națională:
Winner: 2004, 2006, 2007, 2009, 2010, 2011, 2012
Cupa României:
Winner: 2006, 2011, 2012
EHF Cup Winners' Cup:
Semifinalist: 2006
Quarterfinalist: 2007, 2009
EHF Challenge Cup:
Semifinalist: 2004

Individual awards
 Romanian Handballer of the Year: 2009

References

1981 births
Living people
Sportspeople from Ploiești
HC Dobrogea Sud Constanța players
Romanian male handball players